The Bias/Vyas Brahmin is a Brahmin community found in the Indian states of Haryana, Punjab, Gujarat, Rajasthan, Uttar Pradesh and Delhi.

Origin 

The Bias Brahmin community migrated from Gujarat centuries ago and got settled in Haryana, Punjab, Uttar Pradesh, Delhi, Kolkata and Rajasthan. These three sub-communities of the group intermarry. They speak Haryanvi, Punjabi, Hindi or other local dialects. In Haryana, the community is found mainly in the districts of Bhiwani, Hisar, Sirsa, Sonepat, Rohtak, Jhajjar and Karnal.

Present circumstances 

The traditional occupation of the Vyas is that of village priests. A small number were large landowners, but most of the community are petty landowners. In some respects, they are regarded as the highest class of Brahmins. Like other Brahmin groupings, they have been more successful in taking up higher education, and generally are economically well off. Nowadays, their intermarriage with Gaurs is quite common.

References 

Brahmin communities across India
Social groups of Punjab, India
Brahmin communities of Uttar Pradesh
Brahmin communities of Rajasthan
Brahmin communities of Delhi
Brahmin communities of Haryana